Guo Ningning (born July 1970) is a Chinese politician and banker currently serving as vice-governor of southeast China's Fujian province. Guo has been tipped as a rising star in the "7th Generation" of the Communist Party of China.

Biography
Guo was born in July 1970 in Shenyang, Liaoning, and graduated from the Tsinghua University School of Economics and Management. 

After university, she served in several posts in the Bank of China before serving as vice-president of the Agricultural Bank of China in June 2016. She is the first female vice-president of the Agricultural Bank of China since it was established in 1951.

In October 2018, she was transferred to Fuzhou, capital of southeast China's Fujian province, where she became a party member of the CPC Fujian Provincial Committee. On 23 November 2018, Guo was appointed vice-governor of Fujian at the Seventh Meeting of the 13th Standing Committee of the People's Congress of Fujian. She became the youngest female provincial and ministerial level official in Chinese mainland.

In 2020, Guo participated in an online campaign to promote Fujian's seafood and ate an eel on a livestream that got more than one million views.

Recognition 
In 2021, she was included in the Time 100 Next list.

References

1970 births
Tsinghua University alumni
Living people
Chinese women bankers
People's Republic of China politicians from Liaoning
Chinese Communist Party politicians from Liaoning
21st-century Chinese women politicians
21st-century Chinese politicians
Political office-holders in Fujian
Politicians from Shenyang
Businesspeople from Shenyang